Nari (Naray) District is a mountainous district in the eastern part of Kunar Province in Afghanistan. It borders Bar Kunar District to the west, Nuristan Province to the north, Khyber Pakhtunkhwa to the east and Dangam district to the south. The population was reported in 2006 as 24,500 of which around 60% is ethnic Pashtun. The district center is the village of Nari (Naray)  at 1153 m altitude in a river valley. The arable land is not enough. The residents usually collect wood and beans and sell them.

See also
Districts of Afghanistan

References

AIMS District Map
District Profile

External links

Building Bridges in the Back of Beyond Washington Post May 1, 2008

Districts of Kunar Province